Meelis Rämmeld (born 4 April 1975 in Tallinn) is an Estonian actor.

In 1997 he graduated from Viljandi Culture Academy Theatre Department. After graduating he worked in Ugala Theatre. Since 2015 he is working at Endla Theatre. Besides theatre roles he has played also in several films and television series.

In early summer 2016, Rämmeld married actress Kadri Adamson. In 2017, the couple had a daughter.

Filmography

 2004: Stiilipidu (feature film; role: Andres)
 2016: Polaarpoiss (feature film; role: Mattias' lawyer)
 2013: Free Range: Ballaad maailma heakskiitmisest (feature film; role: Susanna's father)
 2017: November (feature film; role: Jaan)
 2018: Eia jõulud Tondikakul (feature film; role: tractorist Pets)
 2018: Põrgu Jaan (feature film; role: Jaan)
 2018: Portugal (feature film; role: Karl)
 2020: Maakohus (feature film; role: judge)
 2020: Rain (feature film; role: Musa-Mart)
 2020: On the Water (feature film; role: Fisherman)
 2022: Kalev (feature film; role: Aggressive man in bar)
 2023: Suvitajad (feature film; role: Johan)

References

Living people
1975 births
Estonian male stage actors
Estonian male film actors
Estonian male television actors
20th-century Estonian male actors
21st-century Estonian male actors
Male actors from Tallinn